This is a list of notable former United States citizens who voluntarily relinquished their citizenship, and through that act, their nationality. It includes only public figures who completed the process of relinquishment of United States citizenship. This list excludes people who may have indicated their intent to do so but never formally completed the process, as well as immigrants who had their naturalizations canceled after convictions for war crimes or for fraud in the naturalization process.

List

 Key of reasons
 To take or run for a position in a foreign government. Spouses of foreign heads of state are included in this category.
 To naturalize as a citizen of a foreign country, or to retain citizenship in a foreign country disallowing dual citizenship.
 To protest U.S. policies or actions
 Other or unclear reasons

The column "Federal Register" refers to whether and when the former citizen's name was published by the U.S. government in one of its lists of people giving up citizenship. "Too early" refers to people who relinquished citizenship before publication began. An asterisk indicates that Federal Register data for the quarter in which the person relinquished citizenship has not yet been released. See the article "Quarterly Publication of Individuals Who Have Chosen to Expatriate" for further details on the Federal Register list. The column U.S. Citizenship indicates how the person original ascertained US citizenship. Jus soli ("right of the soil") is citizenship by birth in the United States, whereas jus sanguinis ("right of blood") here refers to citizenship through birth abroad to an American parent.

Federal policy towards U.S. citizens who naturalize in foreign countries has varied over the years. For most of the twentieth century, the State Department regarded such naturalizations as indicating the intent to relinquish U.S. citizenship in almost all cases. However, in 1990 the State Department adopted the administrative presumption that "when a U.S. citizen obtains naturalization in a foreign state, subscribes to routine declarations of allegiance to a foreign state, or accepts non-policy level employment with a foreign state", he or she intends to retain U.S. citizenship, overriding the earlier presumption that such acts indicated intent to relinquish U.S. citizenship.

Relinquished and then regained citizenship

See also

Explanatory notes

References

External links 
 Information on the Renunciation of U.S. Citizenship—U.S. Dept. of State, Bureau of Consular Affairs

Relinquished their nationality